William Montgomery Watt (14 March 1909 – 24 October 2006) was a Scottish Orientalist, historian, academic and Anglican priest. From 1964 to 1979, he was Professor of Arabic and Islamic studies at the University of Edinburgh.

Watt was one of the foremost non-Muslim interpreters of Islam in the West, and according to Carole Hillenbrand "an enormously influential scholar in the field of Islamic studies and a much-revered name for many Muslims all over the world". Watt's comprehensive biography of the Islamic prophet Muhammad, Muhammad at Mecca (1953) and Muhammad at Medina (1956), are considered to be classics in the field.

Early life and education
Watt was born on 14 March 1909 in Ceres, Fife, Scotland. His father, who died when he was only 14 months old, was a minister of the Church of Scotland.

Career

Ordained ministry
Watt was ordained in the Scottish Episcopal Church as a deacon in 1939 and as a priest in 1940. He served his curacy at St Mary The Boltons, West Brompton, in the Diocese of London from 1939 to 1941. When St Mary's was damaged in The Blitz, he moved to Old Saint Paul's, Edinburgh to continue his training. From 1943 to 1946, he served as an Arabic specialist to the Anglican Bishop of Jerusalem.

After Watt returned to academia in 1946, he never again held a full-time religious appointment. He did, however, continue his ministry with part-time and honorary positions. From 1946 to 1960, he was an honorary curate at Old Saint Paul's, Edinburgh, an Anglo-Catholic church in Edinburgh. He became a member of the ecumenical Iona Community in Scotland in 1960. From 1960 to 1967, he was an honorary curate at St Columba's-by-the-Castle, near Edinburgh Castle. Between 1980 and 1993, following his retirement from academia, he was an honorary curate at St Mary the Virgin, Dalkeith and at St Leonard's Church, Lasswade.

Academic career
Watt was Professor of Arabic and Islamic Studies at the University of Edinburgh from 1964 to 1979.

He has been called "the Last Orientalist".

Watt held visiting professorships at the University of Toronto, the Collège de France, and Georgetown University

Later life
Watt died in Edinburgh on 24 October 2006 at the age of 97. He had four daughters and a son with his wife Jean. The family went on holidays in Crail, a Scottish village. On his death, the writer Richard Holloway wrote of Watt that "he spent his life battling against the tide of intolerance".

Honours
Watt received the American Giorgio Levi Della Vida Medal and won, as its first recipient, the British Society for Middle Eastern Studies award for outstanding scholarship.

Watt received an Honorary Doctorate from Aberdeen University.

Views
Watt believed that the Qur'an was divinely inspired but not infallibly true.

Martin Forward, a 21st-century non-Muslim Islamic scholar, states:

Carole Hillenbrand, a professor of Islamic History at the University of Edinburgh, states:

His account of the origin of Islam met with criticism from other scholars such as John Wansbrough of  the University of London's School of Oriental and African Studies, and Patricia Crone and Michael Cook, in their book Hagarism: The Making of the Islamic World (1977), and  Crone's Meccan Trade and the Rise of Islam. However, Both Patricia Crone and Michael Cook have later suggested that the central thesis of the book "Hagarism" was mistaken because the evidence they had to support the thesis was not sufficient or internally consistent enough.

Reception
Pakistani academic, Zafar Ali Qureshi, in his book, Prophet Muhammad and His Western Critics: A Critique of W. Montgomery Watt and Others has criticized Watt as having incorrectly portrayed the life of Muhammad in his works. Qureshi's book was praised by Turkish academic İbrahim Kalın. 

Georges-Henri Bousquet has mocked Watt's book, Muhammad at Mecca, describing it as "A Marxist interpretation of the origins of Islam by an Episcopal clergyman."

Selected works
 The faith and practice of al-Ghazālī (1953) 
 Muhammad at Mecca (1953) 
 Muhammad at Medina (1956)  (online)
 Muhammad: Prophet and Statesman (1961) , a summary of the above two major works  (online)
 Islamic Philosophy and Theology (1962) 
 Islamic Political Thought (1968) 
 Islamic Surveys: The Influence of Islam on Medieval Europe (1972) 
 The Majesty That Was Islam (1976) 
 What Is Islam? (1980) 
 Muhammad's Mecca (1988) 
 Muslim-Christian Encounters: Perceptions and Misperceptions (1991) 
 Early Islam (1991) 
 Islamic Philosophy And Theology (1987) 
 Islamic Creeds (1994) 
 History of Islamic Spain (1996) 
 Islamic Political Thought (1998) 
 Islam and the Integration of Society (1998) 
 Islam: A Short History (1999) 
 A Christian Faith For Today (2002)

References

External links
 Professor W. Montgomery Watt by Carole Hillenbrand
 W. Montgomery Watt: Muhammad, Prophet and Statesman
 "Sirat An-Nabi and the Orientalists" Criticism of some of Watt's works by Muhammad Mohar Ali
 Obituary by Charlotte Alfred. Edinburgh Middle East Report Online, a journal founded in Watt's former department. Winter 2006
 Professor Watt's paper Women in the Earliest Islam
 Interview with Professor Watt on Islam/Christian relations
 William Montgomery Watt's picture

British Islamic studies scholars
Scottish Arabists
Scottish orientalists
Scottish Episcopalian priests
1909 births
2006 deaths
Academics of the University of Edinburgh
Iona Community members
Scottish Christians
20th-century Scottish historians
Writers from Fife
Christian scholars of Islam